Mawdudi and the Making of Islamic Revivalism is a book by Seyyed Vali Reza Nasr, which aims to evaluate the impact of Sayyid Abul Ala Maududi on the Indian subcontinent as well as modern Islamic revivalism as a whole.

See also
 Islamism

References

Books about Islamic fundamentalism